Tubada may refer to:
Melaleuca phoenicea, a bottlebrush plant also known as Tubada
Tubada (coat), an Indian traditional garment